"Teenage Daughters" is a song co-written and recorded by American country music artist Martina McBride.  It is her first single for Republic Nashville.  It was released in March 2011 as the lead-off single from her album Eleven, which was released on October 11, 2011.

History
McBride wrote the song with The Warren Brothers (Brad and Brett Warren). She told Country Weekly magazine that they decided to write the song after talking with the Warrens about her older daughter, Delaney. She said, "I was just saying how one minute you are everything to them[…]and the next minute it's just a whole different thing." After saying that, she decided that they should write about having a teenage daughter. The song was released to the iTunes Store on March 29, 2011, the day that McBride's middle daughter, Emma turned 13.

McBride co-wrote "Teenage Daughters" and seven other songs on the album. She said that after having a top five hit with "Anyway", the first single release that she ever co-wrote, she decided to co-write more frequently.

Critical reception
The song was met with mixed reviews by critics. Matt Bjorke of Roughstock rated it four stars out of five, calling it "a song that any parent[…]can relate to" and saying that it "doesn’t fall into the dramatic melisma-filled type of song that was so often sent out to radio over the years." Blake Boldt of Engine 145 gave the song a "thumbs down." His review praises the song's lyrics for being "a witty and accurate portrayal of what it means to be a parent," but criticized the "misplaced" production and McBride's "whiny, exaggerated" singing.

Music video
The music video shows McBride as the mother of a teenage daughter in the 1950s, the 1970s, and the 1980s. McBride's husband and daughters appear in the video. It was directed by Roman White.

Chart performance

Year-end charts

References

2011 singles
2011 songs
Martina McBride songs
Songs written by Martina McBride
Songs written by the Warren Brothers
Song recordings produced by Byron Gallimore
Music videos directed by Roman White
Republic Records singles
Republic Nashville singles
Songs about teenagers